Oberea praelonga is a species of beetle in the family Cerambycidae. It was described by Thomas Lincoln Casey, Jr. in 1913. It is known from Canada.

References

Beetles described in 1913
praelonga
Taxa named by Thomas Lincoln Casey Jr.